Kim Jong-pil (born 26 November 1956) is a South Korean former football defender who played for the national team in the 1980 Asian Cup. He also played for Korea Electronics FC.

International record

References

External links
 Kim Jong-pil – National Team stats at KFA 

South Korean footballers
South Korea international footballers
1980 AFC Asian Cup players
1956 births
Living people
Association football defenders